This is a list of state work releases in Washington housing adult inmates administered by the Washington State Department of Corrections (WADOC).

Overview
The department currently has 13 work release facilities. All but two of these facilities is operated by contractors, who manage the daily safety and security and have oversight of the facilities full-time (24-hours a day, 7-days per week). Department staff are located on-site to assist in supervision, monitoring, and case management of the offenders and monitoring of the contracts.

Offenders housed in work release facilities have progressed from full confinement to partial confinement and are required to seek, secure and maintain employment in the community, and contribute to their cost of room and board. This model is designed to ensure offenders have employment and housing plans when they are released to communities.

Current Work Releases

References

External links
 Washington State Department of Corrections

Work Releases